Basco Cathedral, canonically named as Our Lady of the Immaculate Conception Cathedral, and commonly known as Santo Domingo Church, is a Roman Catholic cathedral church located in Basco, Northern Batan Island, Batanes, Philippines. 

Because Batanes was named Provincia de la Concepcion in religious records at the time of its establishment, the first church was dedicated to Our Lady of the Immaculate Conception, Patroness of Batanes Prelature. It is speculated that the image of the Immaculate Conception was brought to Batanes during the 1783 expedition.  As a parish church, it bears the name Santo Domingo Church, in honor of the patron saint of the capital of Batanes, which is Basco, while it was dedicated to the Immaculate Conception as a cathedral.

History
With the establishment of Basco town on June 26, 1783, came the evangelical mission headed by Dominican Fathers Bartholome Artiguez and Baltazar Calderon. The first church was built in Basco town and was made of cogon and wood.

Around 1795, due to frequent fires and typhoons that destroyed buildings, stone churches were started to be built, made possible by imported masons, stone cutters, and carpenters from Cagayan. People began to use lime not as just condiment for betel nut chew, but for constructing walls in combination with sand and stone. During this time, construction of the stone church of Basco took place, with Fr. Nicolas Castaño designing the façade in 1812, and the convent in 1814.

The church has undergone renovations in response to disasters. It was burned and reconstructed at around 1860 to 1863, and was refurbished in 1950. The church was badly damaged in the earthquake of July 2000. Under Bishop Jose Salazar, O.P, the cathedral was rebuilt in its original form, which was completed in 2011.

References

External links
 Facebook page 

Roman Catholic churches in Batanes
Roman Catholic cathedrals in the Philippines
21st-century Roman Catholic church buildings
Roman Catholic churches completed in 2011
Churches in the Roman Catholic Territorial Prelature of Batanes